is a 2009 Japanese film based on the novel of the same name by Shinobu Gotoh. The film is directed by Kenji Yokoi and stars Kyousuke Hamao as Takumi Hayama and Daisuke Watanabe as Giichi Saki.

Plot

Takumi Hayama (Kyousuke Hamao) and Giichi "Gui" Saki (Daisuke Watanabe) are now a couple. Their relationship becomes rocky when Gui starts paying attention to first-year student Tooru Morita (Yuki Hiyori). Unaware that Gui is trying to bring together Takeshi Suzuki (Yūta Takahashi) and Morita, who are attracted to each other, before Suzuki leaves school for hospital due to his deteriorating terminal illness condition, Takumi begins to doubt Gui's love and thinks that he has given up on him.

Cast
Kyousuke Hamao as Takumi Hayama
Daisuke Watanabe as Giichi "Gui" Saki
Yukihiro Takiguchi as Shōzō Aikaike
Yūta Takahashi as Takeshi Suzuki
Kei Hosogai as Izumi Takabayashi
Yuki Hiyori as Tooru Morita

References

External links
Official web site

2009 films
Boys' love films
Films based on Japanese novels
Films set in Japan
2000s Japanese-language films
Gay-related films
Japanese LGBT-related films
2009 LGBT-related films
2009 romantic drama films
LGBT-related romantic drama films
2000s Japanese films